Shieh Ming-yan (born 1957) is a Taiwanese legal academic and judge.

Hsieh completed bachelor's and master's degrees in law at National Taiwan University (NTU) and finished a Dr. jur. degree at the Ludwig Maximilian University of Munich in 1990, after which he returned to teach at NTU. Hsieh later served as dean of the College of Law.

Shortly after the Cross-Strait Service Trade Agreement (CSSTA) was signed in June 2013, Shieh signed a petition urging its renegotiation. In April 2014, Shieh lent support to another petition asking the Taipei District Prosecutors’ Office to look into the removal from the Legislative Yuan of students participating in the Sunflower Student Movement protests over the CSSTA. He was critical of the government's response to protesters, stating that the NTU College of Law "truly failed our students, because we have not taught [President] Ma Ying-jeou well."

In May 2019, Ma's successor Tsai Ing-wen nominated Shieh to serve on the Council of Grand Justices. The Legislative Yuan voted to approve Shieh's nomination in June 2019.

References

1957 births
Living people
Taiwanese legal scholars
National Taiwan University alumni
Academic staff of the National Taiwan University
Ludwig Maximilian University of Munich alumni
Taiwanese expatriates in Germany
Law school deans
Taiwanese university and college faculty deans